In Greek mythology, Taulas (Ancient Greek: Tαύλας) was one of the six sons of Illyrius and the eponymous ancestor of the Taulantii.

Note

References
 Gaius Valerius Flaccus, Argonautica translated by Mozley, J H. Loeb Classical Library Volume 286. Cambridge, MA, Harvard University Press; London, William Heinemann Ltd. 1928. Online version at theio.com.
Gaius Valerius Flaccus, Argonauticon. Otto Kramer. Leipzig. Teubner. 1913. Latin text available at the Perseus Digital Library.
Henri J.W. Wijsman, Valerius Flaccus Argonautica, Book VI: A Commentary, Book 6, BRILL, 2000, p. 102.

Characters in Greek mythology